Massimo Zanetti (born 12 February 1948 in Treviso) is an Italian entrepreneur and former politician, owner of Segafredo, a global coffee company. Since 2016 Zanetti is also the owner of the Italian basketball team Virtus Bologna, one of the most successful teams in Europe, of which he formally became president in October 2021. He is often called by media the "King of Coffee".

Biography
Massimo Zanetti was born in Treviso in 1948. During 1970s he moved to Bologna where he acquired the local company Segafredo, an historic coffee producer with a fairly well known brand. Zanetti gave impulse and new vitality to the company, to which he added its own brand "Segafredo Zanetti", opening it to international markets, diversifying it with the creation of a worldwide network, making it in a few years one of the top coffee producers in the world. The holding company, Massimo Zanetti Beverage Group (MZB), coordinates the group's activities and invests about 1,200 million dollars. The Segafredo headquarter is based in Pianoro, in the Bologna hinterland.

In the 1994 general election he was elected Senator for Forza Italia, the liberal conservative party founded by the media magnate Silvio Berlusconi. The legislature ended in 1996, after the fall of Berlusconi's government in 1995 and the short-lived technocratic cabinet of Lamberto Dini. Zanetti decided not to run for a second term in the 1996 general election.

In the 2013 local elections, Zanetti ran for mayor of Treviso, supported by Civic Choice, a liberal and centrist party of former Prime Minister Mario Monti, getting 10.57% and arriving third not accessing the ballot. After a first attempt to agree with the center-right candidate Giancarlo Gentilini, he decided not to give voting instructions to his voters.

Sports activities
The Segafredo brand appeared as the main sponsor on the jerseys of Bologna F.C. between 1986 and 1989, on those of Gorizia Basketball between 1984 and 1988 and on those of A.C.D. Treviso in different years between 1986 and 2006.

On 23 December 2010, after a long and troubled negotiation lasting about a month, the Bologna 2010 entrepreneurial group, led by Giovanni Consorte, bought 100% of Bologna football team from Sergio Porcedda and Francesca Menarini. At the same time, Zanetti assumed the position of president. The office of honorary president, not operative, was held by the popular singer Gianni Morandi.

On 21 January 2011, Zanetti unexpectedly resigned as chairman of Bologna and as a director of the holding company due to contrasts with the other shareholders. After his resignation Zanetti still remained the relative majority shareholder of the club. In March 2011, the entrepreneur and former president Alfredo Cazzola tried to take over the shares of Zanetti, but the negotiations were not successful, so Zanetti remained shareholder, although no longer intending to participate in club's life.

However, on 25 September 2014 he announced its willingness to become the majority shareholder again. The negotiations that would have provided for the acquisition of 51% of the club's shares and the return of Zanetti as president of the club failed in October 2014, when the club was bought by the Canadian entrepreneur Joey Saputo.

In 2016, Segafredo entered in Trek–Segafredo, a professional road bicycle racing team, which signed, among others Alberto Contador, John Degenkolb, Ivan Basso and Ryder Hesjedal.

Virtus Bologna
In 2016, Segafredo Zanetti became the main sponsor of Virtus Bologna, the main basketball team in the town and one of the most successful one in Italy and Europe. On 23 March 2017 he participated in the capital increase of the club, with a 47% of shares, becoming de facto the club's owner. Under Zanetti's ownership, on 5 May 2019, Virtus won its fifth European title, the Basketball Champions League in Antwerp, defeating Iberostar Tenerife 73–61. The BCL was team's first European title after ten years. While in June 2021, after having knocked out 3–0 both Basket Treviso in the quarterfinals and New Basket Brindisi in the semifinals, Virtus defeated 4–0 its historic rival Olimpia Milano in the national finals, winning its 16th national title and the first one after twenty years.

On 28 October 2021, Zanetti was elected president of Virtus, succeeding Giuseppe Sermasi at the head of the club, and became the only shareholder after a €2 million capital increase. After having ousted Lietkabelis, Ulm and Valencia in the first three rounds of the playoffs, on 11 May 2022, Virtus defeated Frutti Extra Bursaspor by 80–67 at the Segafredo Arena, winning its first EuroCup and qualifying for the EuroLeague after 14 years.

Electoral history

First-past-the-post elections

Municipal elections

References 

 
1948 births
Living people
People from Treviso
Forza Italia politicians
Civic Choice politicians
Businesspeople in coffee